Leucopogon biflorus  is a species of flowering plant in the heath family Ericaceae and is endemic to eastern Australia. It is an erect to spreading shrub with hairy branchlets, oblong leaves and small white flowers.

Description

Taxonomy
Leucopogon biflorus was first formally described in 1810 by Robert Brown in his Prodromus Florae Novae Hollandiae. The specific epithet (biflorus) means "two-flowered".

Distribution and habitat
Leucopogon biflorus grows in woodland, sometimes on rocky outcrops and occurs in south-east Queensland and as far south as Dunedoo in New South Wales.

References

biflorus
Ericales of Australia
Flora of New South Wales
Flora of Queensland
Plants described in 1810
Taxa named by Robert Brown (botanist, born 1773)